Our Lady of Akita is the Catholic title of the Blessed Virgin Mary associated with the Marian apparitions reported in 1973 by Sister Agnes Katsuko Sasagawa in the remote area of Yuzawadai, an outskirt of Akita, Japan. The messages emphasize prayer (especially recitation of the Holy Rosary) and penance in combination with cryptic visions prophesying sacerdotal persecution and heresy within the Catholic Church. A wooden statue representing the apparitions is venerated by faithful Japanese and other Catholics. In December of 1973, a Japanese television station videotaped tears coming from the statue's eyes.

The apparitions were unusual in that the weeping statue of the Virgin Mary was broadcast on Japanese national television, and gained further notice with the sudden healing of hearing impairment experienced by Sasagawa after the apparitions. The image also became affiliated with The Lady of All Nations movement, with which the message shares some similarities.

The local ordinary of the convent, John Shojiro Ito, Bishop of Niigata, recognized "the supernatural character of a series of mysterious events concerning the statue of the Holy Mother Mary" and authorized "the veneration of the Holy Mother of Akita" within the Roman Catholic Diocese of Niigata in a 1984 pastoral letter.

Background

For several decades, Sasagawa, originally from a Buddhist family, had encountered many health problems. She was born premature and suffered poor health most of her life. She also had a poorly performed appendix operation and was immobile for over a decade. Her health reportedly improved after drinking water from Lourdes while under the care of a Catholic nun. After going totally deaf, she went to live with the nuns near Akita.

Apparitions
In 1973, Sasagawa reported apparitions, as well as stigmata and a wooden statue of the Virgin Mary which was said to have wept on 101 occasions. The nuns at Yuzawadai also reported stigmata on the statue, as well as on the hands of Sasagawa; the stigmata on the statue supposedly appeared before the tears started, and disappeared after the tears.

Sasagawa reported three messages from the Blessed Virgin during 1973, but the statue itself is reported to have continued weeping thereafter. Sasagawa reported that she first heard the statue calling her, and then the first message began.

Messages
Sasagawa claimed to have started receiving the first of the messages from the Virgin Mary on July 6, 1973. Sasagawa described that when this happened, the statue became illuminated as it acknowledged her stigmata and hearing impairment. She was instructed to recite the prayer of the Handmaids of the Eucharist, which the Virgin Mary said would cure her deafness. The other reported messages ask for the praying of the rosary and to pray Acts of Reparation.

The second message includes the following: "Many men in this world afflict the Lord. I desire souls to console Him to soften the anger of the Heavenly Father. I wish, with my Son, for souls who will repair by their suffering and their poverty for the sinners and ingrates."

The third message was communicated on October 13, 1973. It was claimed that the statue became animated for an extended period and was witnessed by a number of nuns. The third Our Lady of Akita message is:

Medical cures
Sasagawa was admitted to the community of the Sisters of Junshin in Nagasaki.
She experienced hearing loss in her left ear years earlier; she experienced hearing loss in her right ear for first time in March 1973 at Myōkō, Niigata.

Sasagawa moved into the convent of the Seitai Hoshikai Handmaids of the Holy Eucharist at Yuzawadai on 12 May 1973. The three messages from the statue were "perceived by the deaf ears of" Sasagawa while she was a novice at the convent.

In October 1974,  In March 1975, Sasagawa began to "experience violent headaches" and hearing loss.
The diagnoses of two hearing examinations in March 1975 was hearing loss in both ears. Dr. Sawada of the Niigata Rosai Hospital at Jōetsu, Niigata, verified that she was 'incurably deaf' and issued documents for her to receive a state subsidy.
Dr. Arai of the Eye and Ear Division of the Akita Red Cross Hospital also verified her complete deafness.

In May 1982, Sasagawa experienced a sudden improvement in hearing. In June 1982, Sawada attested that Sasagawa's hearing was fully restored.
According to Yasuda, the hearing improvement noticed during Sasagawa's 1982 hearing examination was not certified as a "miraculous cure" by the hospital.

On August 4, 1981, a Korean woman with a terminal brain tumor was miraculously cured after friends and relatives prayed for the intercession of Our Lady of Akita. Her name is Teresa Chun Sun Ho. She received visions of Mary related to the Akita events during her recovery, the first while comatose. Her disease was diagnosed and the subsequent cure verified by medical professionals in South Korea.
Yasuda wrote that according to Chun and other October 1983 Korean pilgrims, Chun's cure "had been declared miraculous by Church authorities of Korea".

Stigmata
Sasagawa "claimed to have had a stigmatic-like experience". Her left hand developed bleeding marks. Yasuda wrote that in June 1973 "in the center of  palm were two red scratches in the form of a cross" which seemed to have "been engraved in the skin" and began to bleed a few days later. "There were two red traces in the form of a cross and they seemed to cause  pain", according to one nun. According to Sasagawa's account, the stigmata emerged after she began seeing supernatural beings, which appeared to be angels, and two incidents where she felt piercing pain in the palm of her hand. When the wound appeared in her hand, there were several explanations proposed, including the theory of ectoplasmic capability, although theologians said that the stigmata on Sasagawa and the statue's hands were meant as signs.

Weeping statue

The palm of the statue's right hand oozed a liquid from two short intersecting lines. It was described as "a blackish mark," by one nun; "one would have said that it had been traced with a fine point of a pencil." "One would have said that they were traced by a pen with black ink," according to a second nun. "On these lines there stood out two darker points. It resembled very much ink which had spread under the effect of heat. I said to myself that the Novice Mistress must have spoken of these points when she saw blood flow through a hole as large as that of a needle." A third nun, who had been the sacristan, described that she "saw in the middle of the palm of the right hand that a wound in the form of a cross had been cut with something like the tip of a blade."

TV Tokyo Channel 12 videotaped the weeping statue in December 1973. The blood type of the statue and its sweat and tear type were found to be types B and AB, respectively.

Approval timeline

 1975: Bishop Ito begins initial consultation with the Congregation for the Doctrine of the Faith (CDF).
 1976: Ito creates an inquiry commission which arrives at the conclusion that it is "not in a position to prove the supernatural events".
 1979: On the basis of new  norms for examining "presumed apparitions or revelations", which had been published the previous year, Bishop Ido requests a CDF intervention to create another inquiry commission.
 1981: The CDF, being "unfavorable to the events", responds that it will not initiate a new examination.
 1982: Bishop Ito, asserting that the 1981 CDF response "contained some misunderstandings", sends a "complete dossier, augmented with the new facts" to the CDF.
 1983: Ito meets with CDF officials while the case remains under examination.
 1984: On April 22, Bishop Ito, noting that the case had been under examination for eight years, writes that he does not find in the events "any elements which are contrary to Catholic faith and morals". He asserts "the supernatural character of a series of mysterious events concerning the statue" in the convent, authorizes "the veneration of the Holy Mother of Akita" within the Diocese of Niigata ("while awaiting [a] definitive judgment on this matter" pronounced by the Holy See), and clarifies that the events were a private revelation and not necessary for salvation like public revelation.
 1988: Ito meets with Cardinal Ratzinger, head of the CDF, in June. Ratzinger gives his verbal approval to Ito's 1984 letter, but without rendering "judgement about the credibility of the events".

The Holy See never rendered definitive judgement, either positive or negative. Because Ito's declaration of approval has not been reversed by his successors or by the Holy See, the apparition remains officially approved according to the guidelines of the Catholic Church.

See also
 Acts of reparation
 Marian apparition
 History of Roman Catholicism in Japan

Notes

References

English abstract of

External links 
 Convent-Marian Shrine of Our Lady of Akita
 December 2015 National Geographic map showing Our Lady of Akita approval  

Akita
Catholicism in Japan
Titles of Mary
1973 in Christianity
Christian miracles
Akita (city)